Bob Casullo (born March 21, 1951) is a former NFL and college coach who most recently coached for the Tampa Bay Buccaneers, having started his NFL career in 2000 coaching Special Teams for the Raiders.  Casullo who has 35 years of coaching experience was most recently the Assistant Head Coach and Special Teams Coordinator for Syracuse University but left that position in November 2010, one week before the team's final regular season game.  Bob and his Wife Pat have 2 sons, Rocco & Jamie.

Early life
Casullo attended Little Falls High School where he was a three-sport athlete for the Mounties. He was a captain for all three (football, basketball and baseball) teams. After starring at quarterback in high school, Casullo went on to a career as Fullback for the Brockport State University football team in New York, earning honorable mention All-America honors his senior season.

Coaching career

Raiders
Throughout his college and NFL career, Casullo  has distinguished himself as one of the league's better special teams coaches.  His special teams unit helped the Raiders to three consecutive AFC West titles (2000–2002) including an appearance in Super Bowl XXXVII.  In 2000, his unit led the whole of the NFL in net punting average.  In 2001, they led the AFC sending their punter to the Pro Bowl.  That year, he also produced an outstanding kickoff coverage unit (best in the NFL), that kept opponents less than 20 yards from their own end zone 17 times.  In his final year with the Raiders he produced a unit that was third in the NFL in punt return average.

Jets
During his 2004 season with the New York Jets as tight ends coach, Curtis Martin won the NFL Rushing title (by 1 yard).

Seahawks
His first season with the Seahawks, in 2005, was rocky but not without success.  The special teams were plagued by injuries and saw a rotation of injury replacements.  Casullo had lost former Special Teams Pro Bowler Alex Bannister to another broken collar bone, and the other injuries to WRs, LBs and DB began to eat into his personnel.  There were also miscues: several fumbles on kick and punt returns, some lost, notably at (certainly not in) the hands of Josh Scobey seemed to portend ill tidings.  Blown coverages that allowed a kick return for a touchdown in St. Louis versus the hated Rams, and a punt return for a touchdown by Steve Smith in the NFC Championship game threatened to doom the Seahawks greatest season.  But converted safety Jordan "Big Play Babs" Babineaux forced a fumble on special teams which was recovered by long snapper J. P. Darche to seal the victory in St. Louis.  There was evidence of an illegal block in the back freeing Steve Smith for the punt returned for a TD, but the officials picked up the flag, surprising and elating the Carolina radio crew.  Josh Brown, who provided his share of game-winning kicks, ultimately tied a franchise record of 8 50+ yard field goals and earned an invite as a Pro Bowl alternate.

Buccaneers
On January 19, 2007, Casullo was reunited with Coach John Gruden & hired as the tight ends coach for the Tampa Bay Buccaneers, replacing the departing Ron Middleton.  He joined the staff immediately and will be part of the coaching staff for the Senior Bowl.

Syracuse
On Friday, February 13, 2009, Syracuse University announced that Casullo had been hired as Syracuse University's assistant head coach for football.

On November 22, 2010, Syracuse Head Coach Doug Marrone whom was coached by Casullo at Syracuse has announced that Casullo was no longer a part of the coaching staff.

References

1951 births
Living people
Georgia Tech Yellow Jackets football coaches
New York Jets coaches
Oakland Raiders coaches
Seattle Seahawks coaches
Tampa Bay Buccaneers coaches